The Environment Act 2021 of the Parliament of the United Kingdom aims to improve air and water quality, protect wildlife, increase recycling and reduce  plastic waste. The Act is part of a new legal framework for environmental protection, given the UK no longer comes under EU law post-Brexit.

Friends of the Earth said the Act represented a reduction in protections, rather than an increase. In January 2021 the bill was "severely delayed" for a third time.

Details of the bill
The bill includes powers to prevent the export of plastic waste to developing countries, binding targets on air and water quality and wildlife conservation. The bill contains provision for a new Office for Environmental Protection (OEP) watchdog and would create a framework for legally binding targets, such as to reduce particulate pollution. It will give people a greater say in the management of local street trees and enshrine in law the idea of biodiversity offsetting. The bill also includes new rules intended to stop the import of wood, soy, palm oil, beef, leather and other key commodities to the UK from areas of illegally deforested land.

Most of the bill applies to England and Wales only. Some parts, such as waste management, apply to Northern Ireland only. Provisions on waste including producer responsibility, resource efficiency and exporting waste apply to the whole of the UK. Aspects regarding the environmental recall of motor vehicles and the regulation of chemicals also apply to the whole of the UK.

This bill as well as the updated agriculture bill and fisheries bill will form a new legal framework for environmental protections post-Brexit. Such obligations have for the previous forty years been defined largely by the EU. The UK would be able to diverge in future from new requirements in EU regulations.

Criticism
Of the bill as it stood in January 2021, Friends of the Earth said it represented a reduction in protections, rather than an increase; that the proposed environment watchdog will lack teeth and instead needs full independence and enforcement powers; and called for the inclusion of legally binding targets on plastic pollution, and tougher restrictions on single-use plastics. "Campaigners and many businesses want to see legally binding short-term targets introduced", rather than only long-term targets; World Wide Fund for Nature want a legally binding target date of 2023 by when UK supply chains will be deforestation free; the National Trust want a January 2021 government "proposal to protect 30% of the UK's land for nature by 2030" enshrined in law in the bill.

On the proposal to ban plastic exports to developing countries, the Green Alliance said the UK already has that power, and an obligation to use it under the Basel Convention, an international treaty to prevent transfer of hazardous waste from developed to less developed countries.

Legislative history
The Environment Bill was announced in July 2018 and abandoned during the parliamentary wrangles over Brexit. It received its first reading on 30 January 2020, its second reading on 26 February, and reached committee stage on 10 March. In January 2021 it was "severely delayed" for a third time.

See also
Climate and Ecological Emergency Bill
Climate change in the United Kingdom
Climate crisis
Environmental impact of fashion
Environmental impact of meat production
Social and environmental impact of palm oil

References

External links
Policy paper: Environment Bill 2020: Documents related to the 2020 Environment Bill. The Bill will bring into UK law environmental protections and recovery. at the Parliament of the United Kingdom

2020 in British law
2021 in British law
Proposed laws of the United Kingdom
Environmental law in the United Kingdom
2020 in the environment
2021 in the environment
Conservation in the United Kingdom